Freddy Cricien (born November 4, 1975), also known as Freddy Madball, is an American vocalist, primarily known as the lead singer of the New York hardcore band Madball. He is also the lead singer of Hazen Street and has a hip hop career from which debut album was November 2009's Catholic Guilt. He also moonlights as an MC with DJ Stress as the hip hop duo Freddy Madball & DJ Stress.

Biography

Early life
Cricien was born in Passaic, New Jersey on November 4, 1975. His mother is from Havana, Cuba and his father is from Barranquilla, Colombia. He has three older siblings from the same mother. The eldest is Roger Miret of Agnostic Front. At five years old, Freddy and his family relocated to Miramar, Florida. Roger stayed behind and soon after became immersed in the New York hardcore music scene.

Career
When Cricien was about seven years old, he visited with his brother in New York City and began to perform on stage with Agnostic Front. Shortly after, he began to join the band on tour. At 12 years old, Cricien recorded Madball's first 7-inch, Ball of Destruction. It consisted of used and unused Agnostic Front material. The original lineup featured Roger Miret on bass, Vinnie Stigma on guitar, Will Shepler on drums, and Cricien on vocals.

When Cricien was 16 years old, he moved permanently to New York City and moved in with Miret. In 1992, Madball recorded and released the Droppin Many Suckas EP. This recording featured original music and the addition of Matt Henderson on guitar. In the years to follow, Madball continued to release new albums (Set It Off-1994, Demonstrating My Style-1996, Look My Way-1998, Been There, Done That-1998, Hold It Down-2000, N.Y.H.C-2004, Legacy-2005, Infiltrate the System-2007, Empire-2010, Rebellion EP-2012, Hardcore Lives-2014, and most recently For the Cause-2018)

Cricien has made guest appearances on tracks by bands such as Fear Factory (vocals on the bonus track Agnostic Front song "Your Mistake"), Deviate (vocals on "Last Judgement"), Sick of It All (vocals on "Forked Tongue" on the Death to Tyrants album), H2O (guest vocals on the song "Guilty By Association" on the F.T.T.W. album), 25 ta Life (guest vocals on "Loyal to da Grave" on the Strength Through Unity album), Shutdown (guest vocals on "Few and Far Between" on the album of the same name), Skarhead (guest vocals on "I Won't Change" on the album Kings at Crime).

References

External links

1976 births
Living people
American punk rock singers
American heavy metal singers
American people of Colombian descent
American people of Cuban descent
Hispanic and Latino American musicians
People from Florida
Singers from New York City
21st-century American singers
21st-century American male singers
Hazen Street members
Madball members